Hedwig Lachmann (29 August 1865 – 21 February 1918) was a German author, translator and poet.

Life and work
Lachmann was born in Stolp, Pomerania in 1865, to a Jewish family, and was the daughter of a cantor, Isaak Lachmann. She spent her childhood in Stolp and a subsequent seven years in Hürben (Swabia). At the age of 15, she passed exams in Augsburg to become a language teacher. Two years later she became a governess in England.

From 1899 until 1917 she belonged to both Friedrichshagener and Pankower poetry societies.

She met her future husband, Gustav Landauer, in 1899 at Richard Dehmel's house. One of their grandchildren, Mike Nichols, grew up to be a famous American television, stage and film director, writer, and producer. She died in Krumbach, Swabia, a very early fatality of the 1918 flu pandemic.

Works
Poetry

Im Bilde 1902
Collection of Poetry post. 1919

Translations

From English
Oscar Wilde: Salome. This became the libretto for Richard Strauss's opera Salome.
Works from Edgar Allan Poe
Works from Rabindranath Tagore:  The Post Office, The King of the Dark Chamber

From Hungarian
Hungarian Poems 1891
Works from Sándor Petőfi

From French
Works from Honoré de Balzac

References

External links

 
 
 
German Tragedies: Robert Nichols Remembers

1869 births
1918 deaths
Deaths from Spanish flu
People from Słupsk
19th-century German Jews
German women writers
People from the Province of Pomerania